Bible Black was an American band, formed by two ex-Elf/Rainbow musicians: drummer Gary Driscoll and bassist Craig Gruber. It also featured guitarist Duck McDonald, Joey Belladonna (who later departed to join Anthrax), and singer Jeff Fenholt (famous for his lead role in Jesus Christ Superstar).

The band, based in the East Coast, released the self-titled album Bible Black in 1981. It was followed by  Ground Zero in 1983, and then by Burning at the Speed of Light, a collaboration with another group called "Thrasher". None of the albums were particularly successful.

In 1985, McDonald joined Savoy Brown. Driscoll found regular work, which he supplemented with stints as a session musician.

Discography
 Bible Black (1981)
 Ground Zero (1983)
 Burning at the Speed of Light (Recorded with Thrasher; 1985)

External links
 Myspace.com
 Bluecheer.us
 Myspace.com
 Myspace.com
 Musicmight.com
 Jeffcramer.blogspot.com
 Lastfm.ru

Hard rock musical groups from New York (state)
Heavy metal musical groups from New York (state)